Poiana Stadium is a multi-use stadium in Poiana Câmpina. It is the home ground of FCM Câmpina. It holds 4,000 people.

References 

Football venues in Romania